The Marylebone Cricket Club (MCC) tour of Bangladesh during the winter of 1976/77 marked the entrance of Bangladesh into international cricket. Though the tour was very short, it gave the Bangladeshi players their first taste of international cricket.

In May 1976 Bangladesh invited the MCC to tour. In June, the International Cricket Council discussed Bangladesh's membership and they decided to wait for the MCC tour before allowing Bangladesh membership.

The MCC team

 Ted Clark (captain)
 John Lofting (player-manager)
 John Barclay
 Alan Duff 
 Mike Hooper
 Roderick Kinkead-Weekes
 Michael Mence
 Mick Norman
 Dudley Owen-Thomas 
 Dan Piachaud
 Nigel Popplewell
 Brian Taylor
 Martin Vernon 
 Derek Wing

Apart from Popplewell, whose first-class career was yet to begin, and Lofting, who never played first-class cricket, all the team had had first-class careers, of varying lengths, but only Barclay and Vernon were still playing.

The tour
The MCC team arrived at Dhaka on December 27, 1976. On December 29, they left for Rajshahi for the first 2-day match against the North Zone. However, the main attraction of the tour was the three-day unofficial Test match at Dhaka against the Bangladesh national side, which drew a total attendance of some 90,000.

Scores in brief

Notes
Raquibul Hasan, one of the most respected cricketers in the country earned the distinction of leading the North Zone side.

Shamim Kabir led Bangladesh in the historic match at Dhaka. The other players were, Raquibul Hasan, Mainul Haque Mainu, Syed Ashraful Haque, Omar Khaled Rumy, SM Faruk, Shafiq-ul-Haq Hira (WK), Yousuf Babu, Daulatuzzaman, Dipu Roy Chowdhury & Nazrul Kader Lintu.

The positive report of the MCC about the condition of Bangladesh cricket helped Bangladesh get associate membership of the International Cricket Council in July 1977. The interest created by the tour played a big part in the rise in popularity of cricket in Bangladesh through the 1980s.

References

External links
 Daily Star 
 "Bangladesh v MCC XI – A historic day in Bangladesh cricket" by Faisal Caesar

Further reading
 J.G. Lofting, "Bangladesh back on the map", The Cricketer, April 1977, p. 29

1976 in Bangladeshi cricket
1976 in English cricket
1977 in Bangladeshi cricket
1977 in English cricket
Bangladeshi cricket seasons from 1971–72 to 2000
English cricket tours of Bangladesh
International cricket competitions from 1975–76 to 1980
Bangladesh 1976-77